Icelandic Transport Authority (Icetra) is the transport agency of Iceland. Its head office is in Reykjavík.

References

External links
 Icelandic Transport Authority
 Icelandic Transport Authority 

Government of Iceland
Transport authorities